Chastity Bites is a 2013 comedy-horror film written by Lotti Pharriss Knowles and directed by John V. Knowles.

Plot 

A feminist blogger and reporter for a school newspaper tries to stop Countess Elizabeth Báthory, who poses as an abstinence counselor in a high school, from killing the school's virgins to stay young and beautiful.

Cast 
 Allison Scagliotti as Leah
 Francia Raisa as Katharine
 Eddy Rioseco as Paul
 Chloë Crampton as Kelly
 Greer Grammer as Nicole
 Sarah Stouffer as Britney
 Lindsey Morgan as Noemi
 Amy Okuda as Ashley
 Louise Griffiths as Liz Batho / Elizabeth Báthory

Director Stuart Gordon appears in a cameo.

Release 
Chastity Bites premiered on June 1, 2013, at the Dances With Films film festival.  It was released on video on demand on November 1, 2013, and on DVD on February 11, 2014.

Reception 
Scott Hallam of Dread Central rated it 2/5 stars and wrote that despite "some fun moments", the film fails to live up to its potential.  Patrick Cooper of Bloody Disgusting rated it 3/5 stars and called it "a solid horror-comedy" that comes across as a TV show episode.  Elias Savada of Film Threat rated it 3/5 stars and called it a "delightfully cheesy horror comedy".  Gordon Sullivan of DVD Verdict called it a feminist film that favors comedy over horror.

References

External links 

 
 
 
 

2013 films
2013 horror films
2013 comedy horror films
American comedy horror films
American high school films
American independent films
Vampire comedy films
Cultural depictions of Elizabeth Báthory
2013 directorial debut films
2013 comedy films
2013 independent films
2010s English-language films
2010s American films